Euthyatira pudens, the dogwood thyatirid moth or peach-blossom moth, is a moth of the family Drepanidae. The species was first described by Achille Guenée in 1852. It is found in North America, where it ranges across southern Canada, south to the Gulf of Mexico. The habitat consists of moist forests and riparian zones along creeks at low to middle elevations.

The wingspan is 40–45 mm. There are two distinct forms. The common form has pink-white patches at the base, along the costa and at the apex. There is a coppery-brown spot at the anal angle. The hindwings are brown. Form pennsylvanica is darker, blackish near the wing base, and does not have the pink-white patches. Adults are on wing in spring in one generation per year.

The larvae feed on Cornus species. The larvae are dark gray black with a white ventral area.

References

Moths described in 1852
Thyatirinae